Sept-Îles or Sept Îles (seven islands in French) may refer to:

France 
 Sept-Îles, France, also known as Jentilez, a small French archipelago off the north coast of Brittany and an important bird reserve
 Sept-Îles Lighthouse

Canada 
 Sept-Îles, Quebec, city of Côte-Nord
 Sept Îles Lake (Saint-Raymond), a lake in Saint-Raymond, Portneuf Regional County Municipality, Quebec
 Sept Îles Lake (Saint-Ubalde), a lake in Saint-Ubalde, Portneuf Regional County Municipality, Quebec
 Rivière des Sept Îles, a tributary of the Portneuf River in Saint-Raymond and Saint-Basile in Portneuf Regional County Municipality, Quebec